I Remember is the second studio album by English electronic music duo AlunaGeorge, released on 16 September 2016 by Island Records. The album includes collaborations with Popcaan, Zhu, Leikeli47, Dreezy, Flume and Pell. The album's lead single, "I'm in Control", was released in February 2016, featuring vocals from rapper Popcaan, and peaked at number 39 on the UK Singles Chart.

The album received generally positive reviews from music critics. I Remember debuted at number 71 on the UK Albums Chart, selling 1,419 copies in its first week.

Background
The concept for the album emerged in 2014, when AlunaGeorge took part in several collaborations. One of the first collaborations was with DJ Snake, who remixed the duo's 2012 single "You Know You Like It". It was released in October 2014 and peaked at number 67 on the UK Singles Chart. Later that year, they collaborated with electronic musician Zhu on his lead track "Automatic" from his debut extended play Genesis Series.

In January 2016, the duo released their first official track since 2014, "I'm in Control", featuring vocals from dancehall rapper Popcaan. The single reached number 39 on the UK Singles Chart. In April 2016, the duo worked on their third collaboration with electronic musician Kaytranada, alongside rapper GoldLink, titled "Together". The song was released as part of Kaytranada's debut studio album, 99.9%, released in that same month. After the collaboration, the album's second single, "I Remember", was released on 15 April 2016, which later revealed the album's title. The song was produced by Australian musician Flume, and was inspired by their other collaboration with him, titled "Innocence", from his second studio album, Skin.

"My Blood" was released on 28 April 2016 as the album's third single, featuring production work from electronic musician Zhu, who they previously collaborated with in 2015. The fourth single, "Mean What I Mean", featuring vocals from rappers Leikeli47 and Dreezy, was released on 13 July 2016 to promote the album's pre-order release date, which became available on the same day. "Mediator" was released as the album's fifth and final single on 2 September 2016.

Reception

Track listing

Notes
  signifies an additional producer
  signifies a co-producer
  signifies a main and vocal producer

Sample credits
 "Not Above Love" samples "Plan B" by Slow Motion Centerfold.

Personnel
Credits adapted from the liner notes of I Remember.

AlunaGeorge
 Aluna Francis – vocals 
 AlunaGeorge – vocals

Additional musicians

 Pell – additional vocals 
 Ivan Jackson – horn arrangements, trumpet 
 William Roper – tuba 
 Popcaan – additional vocals 
 Leikeli47 – additional vocals 
 Dreezy – additional vocals 
 John Hill – keyboards, synths, drum programming, bass programming 
 Ajay Bhattacharyya – keyboards, synths, drum programming, bass programming 
 Utters – bass guitar, additional programming 
 James Trood – drums, percussion 
 Andrew Smith – Rhodes 
 Nick Tsang – guitar

Technical

 AlunaGeorge – production ; additional production 
 Mark Ralph – production ; mixing ; co-production ; additional production 
 Drew Smith – recording engineering ; recording assistance 
 Tom Ad Fuller – recording engineering ; recording assistance 
 Stuart Hawkes – mastering 
 Zhu – production, mixing 
 Dante Jones – additional production 
 Tony Cousins – mastering 
 Yogi – production 
 Rock Mafia – production 
 Mark "Spike" Stent – mixing 
 Michael Freeman – mix engineering 
 Utters – production, recording engineering, vocal production 
 Stint – production 
 John Hill – production 
 Rob Cohen – recording engineering 
 Flume – production 
 Ryan Gilligan – recording engineering

Artwork
 Arran Gregory – cover illustration
 Liam Ward – art direction

Charts

Notes

References

2016 albums
Albums produced by Flume (musician)
Albums produced by John Hill (record producer)
Albums produced by Rock Mafia
AlunaGeorge albums
Interscope Records albums
Island Records albums